Oleksandr Pindeyev (born 13 March 1975 in Odessa) is a Ukrainian retired football forward who last played for FC Vorskla Poltava.

Champion of Latvia: 1995, 1996, 1997, 1998 (Skonto FC)
Ukrainian Cup holder: 1992 (Chornomorets Odessa)

External links

Article at Vorskla Poltava website. 28-11-2009.
Profile at Vorskla Poltava website
Pideyev at allplayers.in.ua

1971 births
Living people
Footballers from Odesa
Ukrainian footballers
Ukrainian expatriate footballers
Expatriate footballers in Latvia
Expatriate footballers in Russia
Ukrainian Premier League players
FC Chornomorets Odesa players
FC Chornomorets-2 Odesa players
FC Vorskla Poltava players
FC Kremin Kremenchuk players
Skonto FC players
FC Metallurg Lipetsk players
Association football forwards